L&T Mutual Fund is a mutual fund company in India. It caters to the investment needs of investors through various mutual fund schemes. The company claims to have sound investment management practices and a knowledgeable fund management team.

The Asset Management Company (AMC) for all L&T Mutual Fund schemes is L&T Investment Management Limited. The sponsor for the AMC is L&T Finance Holdings Limited (LTFH) which is a listed company and registered with RBI as an NBFC.

L&T Mutual Fund is now HSBC Mutual Fund.

Business

With an average AUM of INR 72,322.38 crores and over 2.2 million active folios, L&T Mutual Fund was the 14th largest mutual fund management company in India, as on September 30, 2022.

The major competitors for L&T Mutual Fund are Kotak Mutual Fund, Franklin Templeton Mutual Fund, UTI Mutual Fund, Sundaram Mutual Fund, IDFC Mutual Fund, Tata Mutual Fund and Invesco Mutual Fund.

Fate 
L&T Finance Holdings, the parent company intended to focus more on its primary business of lending, therefore, it exited the fund management business. It was acquired by HSBC Holdings through its wholly owned subsidiary HSBC Asset Management (India) Pvt. Ltd.

See also
Larsen & Toubro
Mutual funds in India

References

External links
 Official Website
 L&T Realty

Mutual funds of India
Larsen & Toubro
Financial services companies based in Mumbai
Indian companies established in 2010
2010 establishments in Maharashtra
Financial services companies established in 2010